Shaklee Corporation is an American manufacturer and distributor of natural nutrition supplements, beauty products, and household products. The company is based in Pleasanton, California with global operations in Canada, China, Indonesia, Japan, Malaysia, and Taiwan. Its founder, Dr. Forrest Shaklee, invented the first multivitamin in the United States, and Shaklee was the first company in the world to be certified Climate Neutral. 

On November 30, 2018, Shaklee suspended its operations in Mexico after 26 years.

History

Founding
Forrest C. Shaklee (1894–1985), a chiropractor and nutritionist based in his home state of Iowa, and later in Oakland, California, created the first vitamin in the United States labeled "Shaklee's Vitalized Minerals" in 1915. In 1956, Shaklee founded the Shaklee Corporation with his two sons to manufacture nutritional supplements. Starting in 1956, Shaklee began marketing organic, biodegradable cleaning products.

Expansion, divestiture, changes of ownership
Shaklee Corporation was a publicly traded company in the late 1970s and was listed on the New York Stock Exchange. In 1980, the firm relocated its headquarters from an office complex on the Emeryville marina to a state-of-the-art skyscraper in downtown San Francisco's Financial District. In 1982, Shaklee became a Fortune 500 Company. The corporation began to diversify in November 1986 when it purchased the Bear Creek Corporation, a direct marketing company best known for its Harry and David Fruit-of-the-Month Club operation, from RJR Nabisco for $123 million.
In February 1989, Shaklee sold its 78 percent interest in Shaklee Japan to the Yamanouchi Pharmaceutical Company for $350 million, while maintaining its licensing agreement and continuing to collect royalty payments from the Japanese operations.

In March 1989, Shaklee Corporation received an unsolicited acquisition proposal from a group led by Irwin L. Jacobs, the Minneapolis financier known also by his nickname "Irv the Liquidator". Analysts placed the leveraged buyout value of Shaklee at $35 a share. The Jacobs group had been aggressively accumulating Shaklee shares, and disclosed it currently held a 14.98 percent stake in the San Francisco-based company. Shaklee immediately declared a special dividend of $20 a share, seen as a poison pill—a way to discourage takeover interest in Shaklee, although the company disputed that view. Shaklee's anti-takeover provisions came into play when an investor reached 15 percent.

During the next few weeks, Jacobs increased his stake in Shaklee,
however, Shaklee Corporation then announced it was being acquired by Yamanouchi Pharmaceutical for $28 a share in cash, or about $395 million. Yamanouchi's partnership with Shaklee in Japan helped make the transaction possible, and cast Yamanouchi as a "white knight" in helping Shaklee fend off the hostile takeover bid by Jacobs. Jacobs announced he would not challenge the Yamanouchi bid and the deal with Yamanouchi was quickly finalized, making Shaklee a privately held company. In the spring of 2000, the company relocated its headquarters from downtown San Francisco to a new complex in suburban Pleasanton.

In April 2004, Yamanouchi sold Shaklee Corporation to American multi-millionaire Roger Barnett, managing partner of Activated Holdings LLC and a member of the Wolfson family, for $310 million. Bear Creek and the Harry and David line was sold to Wasserstein Perella & Co. for $260 million.

Shaklee promotes itself as a company committed to being green. In 2022, Shaklee announced the introduction of its clean, anti-aging body care collection.

FTC actions

In 1974, in response to Federal Trade Commission order, Shaklee agreed to cease the marketing of its product "Instant Protein" as appropriate for infants, and to cease misrepresentation of the amount of protein in "Instant Protein." Shaklee was further sanctioned by the FTC in 1976 for "requiring, coercing, threatening, or otherwise exerting pressure" on its distributors to maintain or advertise suggested retail prices.

Cycling team
From 1988 to 2000, Shaklee was the title sponsor of an American-based UCI professional cycling team managed by Frank Scioscia. In its final year of existence (2000), Team Shaklee was the top-ranked UCI tier III team in the world and included United States Olympic Team members Jamie Carney, Jonas Carney, Adam Laurent, and Kent Bostick. There is no information listed as to whether or not the team members actually used Shaklee products.

Customers

NASA
Beginning in 1993 and through the end of the NASA shuttle program, Shaklee provided NASA with a customized version of its rehydration beverage, Performance, under the name Astroade for use by Shuttle astronauts.

References

External links
Corporate web site
"Eco-Socialites Make Cleaning Green a Priority", New York Times, April 22, 2007
"James Whittam, 49, President And Chief of Shaklee Companies", New York Times, May 3, 1999

Companies based in Pleasanton, California
Retail companies established in 1915
Privately held companies based in California
Nutritional supplement companies of the United States
1915 establishments in Iowa